Cosme Damian R. Almedilla (born September 27, 1959) is a Roman Catholic bishop who is currently the Bishop of the Diocese of Butuan.

Almedilla was born on September 27, 1959, in the town of San Miguel, Bohol.

Almedilla was ordained to the priesthood on August 4, 1987, and was appointed as bishop of the Diocese of Butuan since March 25, 2019.

See also
Roman Catholic Diocese of Butuan

References

1959 births
21st-century Roman Catholic bishops in the Philippines
People from Bohol
Living people